Horst Schnellhardt (born 12 May 1946) is a German politician who served as a Member of the European Parliament from 1994 until 2009, representing Saxony-Anhalt. He is a member of the conservative Christian Democratic Union, part of the European People's Party.

He is the author and the namesake of the "Schnellhardt compromise" aimed at the defusing of the "vodka war".

References

1946 births
Living people
MEPs for Germany 2004–2009
Christian Democratic Union of Germany MEPs
MEPs for Germany 1999–2004
MEPs for Germany 2009–2014
Recipients of the Cross of the Order of Merit of the Federal Republic of Germany